Heptanal or heptanaldehyde is an alkyl aldehyde.  It is a colourless liquid with a strong fruity odor, which is used as precursor to components in perfumes and lubricants.

Production
The formation of heptanal in the fractional distillation of castor oil was already described in 1878. The large-scale production is based on the pyrolytic cleavage of ricinoleic acid (Arkema method) and on the hydroformylation of 1-hexene with rhodium 2-ethylhexanoate as a catalyst upon addition of some 2-ethylhexanoic acid (Oxea method):

Heptanal naturally occurs in the essential oils of ylang-ylang (Cananga odorata), clary sage (Salvia sclarea), lemon (Citrus x limon), bitter orange (Citrus x aurantium), rose (Rosa) and hyacinth (Hyacinthus).

Properties 
Heptanal is a flammable, slightly volatile colorless liquid of pervasive fruity to oily-greasy odor, which is miscible with alcohols and practically insoluble in water. Because of its sensitivity to oxidation, heptanal is filled under nitrogen and stabilized with 100 ppm hydroquinone.

Heptanal forms flammable vapor-air mixtures. The compound has a flash point of 39.5 °C. The explosion range is between 1.1% by volume as the lower explosion limit (LEL) and 5.2% by volume as the upper explosion limit. Its ignition temperature is 205 °C.

Uses
Heptanal can be used for the production of 1-heptanol via hydrogenation:

The oxidation of heptanal with oxygen in the presence of a rhodium catalysts leads at 50 °C to heptanoic acid in 95% yield. Heptanal reacts with benzaldehyde in a Knoevenagel reaction under basic catalysis with high yield and selectivity (> 90%) to jasminaldehyde, which is mostly used in fragrances for its jasmine-like aroma as a cis/trans isomer mixture.

A by-product of the given reaction is the unpleasant rancid smelling (Z)-2-pentyl-2-nonenal. When good reasons are given, heptanal can be converted into (Z)-2-pentyl-2-nonenal virtually quantitatively in the presence of aqueous boric acid upon azeotropic removal of water.

Full hydrogenation provides the branched primary alcohol 2-pentylnonan-1-ol, also accessible from the Guerbet reaction from heptanol.

References

Alkanals